Banknotes of the United States dollar are currently issued as Federal Reserve Notes (1914–).

Previous banknote versions that have been issued include: Silver Certificates (1878–1964), Gold certificates (1865–1934) and United States Notes (1862–1971).

Federal Reserve Notes

Federal Reserve Notes were first issued in 1914, and differ from their predecessor Federal Reserve Bank Notes in that they were liabilities of the whole Federal Reserve System. They were redeemable in gold until 1933. After that date they stopped to be redeemable in anything, much like United States Notes (which later led to the halting of the production of United States Notes). They switched to small size in 1929 and are the only type of currency in circulation today in the United States. A  note was added in 1963 to replace the  Silver Certificate after that type of currency had been discontinued. Since United States Notes were discontinued in 1971, Federal Reserve Notes are the only type of currency circulating in the US. In 1976, a  note was added, 10 years after the  denomination of United States Note was officially discontinued. The denomination proved to be unpopular and is now treated as a curiosity, although it is still being printed. Since 2004, all notes (except  and ) were progressively changed to have different colors to make them more easily distinguishable from each other, until the last such note was introduced in 2013 (the ).

Historical banknotes

Continental Currency

Before the American Revolution, every one of the Thirteen Colonies had issued its own paper money, most often denominated in British pounds, shillings and pence. In 1776, the newly created United States issued currency which was bought by people who wanted to support the war (it was promised that the currency could be redeemed for Spanish milled dollars once the war would end). At first, the banknotes circulated at par with the stated value, however after a few months they started depreciating until they became almost worthless. The United States agreed to redeem the notes for treasury bonds at 1% of the face value.

Treasury Notes

Treasury Notes were issued from 1812 to 1913, and were interest-bearing notes issued by the United States in times of war or financial unrest. Various notes of various denominations were issued during the War of 1812 (large and small size notes), the Panic of 1837, the Mexican–American War, the Panic of 1857, the Civil War and the Panic of 1907. From the Civil War through the Panic of 1907 they were known as "Certificates of Indebtedness".

Demand Notes

Demand Notes are considered the first paper money issued by the United States whose main purpose was to circulate. They were redeemable in coin. They were replaced by United States Notes in 1862. After the war ended paper money continued to circulate until present day.

United States Notes

United States Notes, also known as Legal Tender Notes, succeeded Demand Notes as the main currency form of the United States. They were not redeemable but were receivable for all taxes and debts, which is what persuaded people to circulate them. In 1934, when Federal Reserve Notes stopped being redeemable in gold, the only difference between them and Legal Tender Notes was that the first were liabilities of the Federal Reserve while the latter were direct liabilities of the United States Treasury Department. In 1966 the  United States Note was discontinued and the  denomination was discontinued altogether. In 1966 a  US note was issued to meet legal requirements about the amount of notes in circulation. In 1971 the production of US notes was halted and they were officially discontinued in 1994.

Fractional Currency

During the American Civil War silver and gold coins were hoarded by the public because of uncertainty about the outcome of the war. People began to use postage stamps instead, encasing them in metal for better protection. The U.S. government decided to substitute paper currency of denominations under a dollar for coins in order to solve the problem. The denominations issued were 3¢, 5¢, 10¢, 15¢, 25¢ and 50¢. There were five issues of fractional currency.

Interest bearing note

Interest bearing notes were issued from 1863-1865 and bore a 5% or 7.3% interest per annum. The 5% notes matured at one year while the 7.3% interest notes (also known as seven-thirties) matured at three years.

Compound interest treasury notes

In 1863 and 1864, compound interest treasury notes were issued. They paid out 6% annual interest compounded semi-annually 3 years after their issue.

Gold Certificates

Gold certificates were issued from 1865 through 1934 and were redeemable in gold coin. Following the 1933 ban on gold ownership in the United States, they were recalled to be redeemed for United States Notes. They were issued in large size through 1929 and in small size thereafter. A  note was added in 1882, followed by a  note in 1907. A  note which was used only for inter-bank transactions was also issued in 1934 but never made available to the general public. It is still illegal to own.

National Bank Notes

National Bank Notes were issued by banks chartered or authorized to do so by the Federal Government. The charter expired after 20 years, but could be renewed. They were of uniform appearance except for the name of the bank and were issued as three series or charter periods: 1869-1882, 1882-1902, and 1902-1922. In 1929 the Great Depression motivated an emergency reissue, but they were discontinued in 1933. The  and  notes are common from most issuing banks. Only three remaining examples of the  note are known, with one held privately; the  note is unknown to exist.

National Gold Bank Notes

National Gold Bank Notes were issued by private banks, mostly from California. The concept is similar to that of the National Bank Notes, the difference being that National Gold Bank Notes were redeemable in gold. They are all rare with the  being by far the most common, with 427 examples known, and the  the rarest, with only 7 examples known. The  note is not known to exist.

Silver Certificates

Silver certificates were issued from 1878 through 1964 and were redeemable in silver coin through 1967 and thereafter in raw silver bullion. Since 1968 they are not redeemable in anything but Federal Reserve Notes. They were removed from circulation in 1964, at the same time as silver coins. They were issued in large size through 1929 and in small size thereafter. ,  and  notes were added in 1882. The small notes were made with a blue seal, except for notes made as an emergency issue for American soldiers in North Africa during World War II, which were made with a yellow seal, as well as a  note made for use only in Hawaii during World War II, which had a brown seal.

Refunding Certificate

Refunding Certificates, issued only in 1879 and only in the  denomination, were special in that their interest (4% per annum) did accrue indefinitely, which was meant as a way to persuade people into buying them.

United States Postal Notes

The US postal note was a note which could be sent by mail. The sender wrote the amount of money they wanted to send, which could be any amount not exceeding , and sent them via mail. The fee for sending the note was face value + 3 cents and the notes required no stamp. They then could be redeemed by the receiver at the Post Office named by the sender. Starting 1887 the notes could be redeemed in coin at any post office. They were discontinued in 1894. There were five distinct types issued.

Treasury or Coin Notes

These notes were issued in 1890 and 1891 and were redeemable in coin. It was the decision of the Secretary of the Treasury whether the coin would be silver or gold.

Federal Reserve Bank Notes

After the Federal Reserve System was created in 1914, alongside Federal Reserve Notes, which are liabilities of the Federal Reserve System as a whole, Federal Reserve Bank Notes were issued. They were liabilities of only the Federal Reserve Bank which issued them. In 1929, like other kinds of notes they switched to small size. They were discontinued in 1934 and no longer available from banks since 1945.

References

 
Monetary reform